Gaius Licinius may refer to:

 Gaius Licinius Stolo, early tribune and consul responsible for land laws
 Gaius Licinius Macer, late statesman and annalist
 Gaius Licinius Mucianus, general of Vespasian